Musei is a comune (municipality) in the Province of South Sardinia in the Italian region Sardinia, located about  west of Cagliari and about  northeast of Carbonia.

Musei borders the following municipalities: Domusnovas, Iglesias, Siliqua, Villamassargia.

Demographic evolution

References

Cities and towns in Sardinia